is a short anime film directed by Koji Morimoto, with production by Studio 4°C and music by Yoko Kanno featuring a young Crystal Kay Williams singing the ending theme.

The work is in Japanese and contains music and dialogue that are intricately linked. It was released in Japan on November 22, 1997. On October 28th, 2022, Studio 4°C made an announcement that the film is online on YouTube worldwide (except Japan) until November 18th, for the first time in HD.

This short was aired on Locomotion for Latin America and Iberia in its Locotomía block.

Plot 
In a world of music and musical plants, a mad scientist is experimenting with the seeds of those plants to create a child, Noiseman. After giving Noiseman a potion to grow faster the scientist couldn't control him anymore and accidentally split his body into a ghost and a crystal with a machine of his. Noiseman is now in control of the whole city, brainwashing people to capture those ghosts and telling the people that the music fruit is forbidden. Tobio who also was brainwashed got hit by a music fruit and remembered the past, where everyone would enjoy the music. He tries to convince Noiseman that his doing is wrong and that he should return the captured ghosts to their crystals but without success. Now the underground people are trying their best to help the ghosts with the help of Tobio's childhood friend.

Release history

References

External links

1990s animated short films
1997 anime films
Anime short films
Anime with original screenplays
Fantasy anime and manga
Studio 4°C
Films directed by Kōji Morimoto